Calamba Medical Center (CMC) is a private hospital in Calamba, located in the province of Laguna, Philippines. The medical center started as a 25-bed hospital in 1989.

Facilities
The medical center built a new 12-storey tower, now CMC Tower 1, in 2011, which was the tallest building in Calamba. The hospital also constructed a nine-storey hospital, CMC Tower 2, in 2018. Tower 1 serves as the medical arts building while the hospital is in Tower 2.

The hospital includes a diagnostic center, an eye center, a dialysis center, kidney center, clinic, offices and a function hall. Calamba Medical Center or CMC is a regional private hospital in the whole Calabarzon. Next to it is the St. Cruz Laguna Polydemic Hospital in Santa Cruz, Laguna.

In 2020, the center established a new cancer treatment center with the first linear accelerator in the province.  This is an advanced device to provide radiotherapy.  The center's clinics will also provide chemotherapy.

References 

Hospitals established in 1989
Buildings and structures in Calamba, Laguna
Hospitals in the Philippines
1989 establishments in the Philippines